Benjamin George Jones CBE (18 November 1914 – 3 April 1989), was a Welsh Solicitor and Liberal Party politician. He was a partner at Linklaters & Paines, Solicitors.

Background
Jones was born the son of Thomas Jones. He was educated at Aberaeron County School and University College of Wales, Aberystwyth. In 1946 he married Menna Wynn-Jones. They had one son and one daughter. He was appointed a CBE in 1979.

Political career
Jones was Liberal candidate for the Merioneth division at the 1959 General Election. He did not stand for parliament again. He was chairman of the London Welsh Association. He was chairman of the Welsh Book Club in London. He was chairman of the Council for the Welsh Language, 1973–78.

Electoral record

References

1914 births
1989 deaths
Liberal Party (UK) parliamentary candidates
Alumni of Aberystwyth University